The James P. McCaffrey Trophy is a Canadian Football League trophy, awarded to the outstanding defensive player in the East Division.  Each team in the East division nominates a candidate, from which the winner is chosen.  Either the winner of this trophy or the winner of the Norm Fieldgate Trophy will also win the Canadian Football League Most Outstanding Defensive Player award.

In 1995, as part of the American expansion, the McCaffrey trophy was given to the most outstanding defensive player in the South Division.

Prior to 1974 the CFL's Most Outstanding Lineman Award was awarded to both outstanding defensive players and outstanding linemen in the East Division.

James P. McCaffrey Trophy winners

2022 – Lorenzo Mauldin (DE), Ottawa Redblacks
 2021 – Simoni Lawrence (LB), Hamilton Tiger-Cats
 2020 – season cancelled - covid 19
 2019 - Simoni Lawrence (LB), Hamilton Tiger-Cats
 2018 - Larry Dean (LB), Hamilton Tiger-Cats
 2017 - Kyries Hebert (LB), Montreal Alouettes
 2016 - Bear Woods (LB), Montreal Alouettes
 2015 - Simoni Lawrence (LB), Hamilton Tiger-Cats
 2014 - Bear Woods (LB), Montreal Alouettes
 2013 - Chip Cox (LB), Montreal Alouettes
 2012 - Shea Emry (LB), Montreal Alouettes
 2011 - Jovon Johnson (DB), Winnipeg Blue Bombers
 2010 - Markeith Knowlton (LB), Hamilton Tiger-Cats
 2009 - Anwar Stewart (DE), Montreal Alouettes
 2008 - Doug Brown (DT), Winnipeg Blue Bombers
 2007 - Jonathan Brown (DE), Toronto Argonauts
 2006 - Barrin Simpson (LB), Winnipeg Blue Bombers
 2005 - Michael Fletcher (LB), Toronto Argonauts
 2004 - Anwar Stewart (DE), Montreal Alouettes
 2003 - Kevin Johnson (LB), Montreal Alouettes
 2002 - Barron Miles (DB), Montreal Alouettes
 2001 - Joe Montford (DE), Hamilton Tiger-Cats
 2000 - Joe Montford (DE), Hamilton Tiger-Cats
 1999 - Calvin Tiggle (LB), Hamilton Tiger-Cats
 1998 - Joe Montford (DE), Hamilton Tiger-Cats
 1997 - Shonte Peoples (LB), Winnipeg Blue Bombers
 1996 - Tracy Gravely (LB), Montreal Alouettes
 1995 - Tim Cofield (DE), Memphis Mad Dogs
 1994 - Tim Cofield (DE), Hamilton Tiger-Cats
 1993 - Elfrid Payton (LB), Winnipeg Blue Bombers
 1992 - Angelo Snipes (LB), Ottawa Rough Riders
 1991 - Greg Battle (LB), Winnipeg Blue Bombers
 1990 - Greg Battle (LB), Winnipeg Blue Bombers
 1989 - Greg Battle (LB), Winnipeg Blue Bombers
 1988 - Grover Covington (DE), Hamilton Tiger-Cats
 1987 - James West (LB), Winnipeg Blue Bombers
 1986 - Brett Williams (DT), Montreal Alouettes
 1985 - Paul Bennett (DB), Hamilton Tiger-Cats
 1984 - Harry Skipper (DB), Montreal Concordes
 1983 - Greg Marshall (DE), Ottawa Rough Riders
 1982 - Zac Henderson (DB), Toronto Argonauts
 1981 - Ben Zambiasi (LB), Hamilton Tiger-Cats
 1980 - Tom Cousineau (LB), Montreal Alouettes
 1979 - Ben Zambiasi (LB), Hamilton Tiger-Cats
 1978 - Randy Rhino (DB), Montreal Alouettes
 1977 - Glen Weir (DT), Montreal Alouettes
 1976 - Granville Liggins (DT), Toronto Argonauts
 1975 - Jim Corrigall (DE), Toronto Argonauts

Outstanding Defensive player in the East Division prior to the trophy

 1974 - Wayne Smith (DL), Ottawa Rough Riders

CFL's Most Outstanding Lineman Award in the East Division prior to the 1974

 1973 - Ed George (OG), Montreal Alouettes
 1972 - Jim Stillwagon (DL), Toronto Argonauts
 1971 - Mark Kosmos (LB), Montreal Alouettes
 1970 - Angelo Mosca (DL), Hamilton Tiger-Cats
 1969 - Billy Joe Booth (DE), Ottawa Rough Riders
 1968 - Ken Lehmann (LB), Ottawa Rough Riders
 1967 - John Barrow (DL), Hamilton Tiger-Cats
 1966 - Ken Lehmann (LB), Ottawa Rough Riders
 1965 - John Barrow (DL), Hamilton Tiger-Cats
 1964 - John Barrow (DL), Hamilton Tiger-Cats
 1963 - Angelo Mosca (DL), Hamilton Tiger-Cats
 1962 - John Barrow (DL), Hamilton Tiger-Cats
 1961 - John Barrow (DL), Hamilton Tiger-Cats
 1960 - Kaye Vaughan (OT), Ottawa Rough Riders
 1959 - John Barrow (DL), Hamilton Tiger-Cats
 1958 - Jackie Simpson (OG), Montreal Alouettes
 1957 - Kaye Vaughan (OT), Ottawa Rough Riders
 1956 - Kaye Vaughan (OT), Ottawa Rough Riders
 1955 - Tex Coulter (OL), Montreal Alouettes

References
CFL Publications: 2011 Facts, Figures & Records

Canadian Football League trophies and awards